Pseudopentameris is a genus of South African plants in the grass family, found only in Western Cape Province.

 Species
 Pseudopentameris brachyphylla (Stapf) Conert
 Pseudopentameris caespitosa N.P.Barker
 Pseudopentameris macrantha (Schrad.) Conert
 Pseudopentameris obtusifolia (Hochst.) N.P.Barker

References

Danthonioideae
Endemic flora of South Africa
Flora of the Cape Provinces
Grasses of South Africa
Poaceae genera